Ekrem Akurgal (March 30, 1911 – November 1, 2002) was a Turkish archaeologist. During a career that spanned more than fifty years, he conducted definitive research in several sites along the western coast of Anatolia such as Phokaia (Foça), Pitane (Çandarlı), Erythrai (Ildırı) and old Smyrna (Bayraklı höyük, the original site of the city of Smyrna before the city's move to another spot across the Gulf of İzmir).

Biography
He was born on March 30, 1911 in the town of Tulkarm in the Beirut Vilayet of the Ottoman Empire (today a Palestinian city in the West Bank), where his mother's family owned a large farm.  He descended from a family of Ottoman intellectuals and religious men, several of whose members had assumed the office of mufti, the highest title of the Islamic clergy in a given region, for the Ottoman province of Herzegovina. His family moved back to İstanbul when he was two years old. For some time, they resided in another family farm, this time near Akyazı. He received his first education from his father's sister and her husband, who taught literature in Darülfünun (Istanbul University today).

Akurgal graduated in 1931 from Istanbul High School for Boys and, having earned a state scholarship, went to the University of Berlin in Germany to study archaeology. In a Frankfurter Allgemeine Zeitung made in 1990, the interviewer was to remark that, now and then, his German was still unmistakably tainted with Berlinerisch.

In 1957, he became a professor in the University of Ankara. He worked mainly in the Aegean Region, starting the research on Phokaia (Foça), Pitane (Çandarlı), Erythrai (Ildırı) and old Smyrna (Bayraklı tumulus). He published numerous books on ancient Greek, Hittite and other ancient civilizations of Anatolia.

Settled in İzmir since the seventies to pursue his work on the nearby sites with more effectiveness, Akurgal died on November 1, 2002 in İzmir. His work and legacy is being carried on by his wife, Meral Akurgal, an accomplished archaeologist herself and his closest assistant in his lifetime.

Awards
 1961 Honorary Doctorate Bordeaux University, France
 1972  German Great Cross of Merit with star
 1981 German Goethe Medal
 1981 Turkish Republic Ministry of Culture Gran Award
 1986 Premio Internazionale "I Cavalli d'Oro di San Marco", Italy
 1987  Italian Commendatore of the Order of Merit of the Republic
 1987  French Légion d'honneur Officier
 1989 Honorary Doctorate University of Athens, Greece
 1990 Honorary Doctorate University of Lecce, Italy
 1990 Honorary Doctorate Anadolu University, Turkey

Bibliography

 Cyril Mango, Ekrem Akurgal, and Richard Ettinghausen. The Treasures of Turkey: The earliest civilizations of Anatolia Byzantium the Islamic Period. (1966), Editions d'Art Albert Skira, Geneva, 253 pp.

Notes

See also
 Legion of Honour
 Legion of Honour Museum 
 List of Legion of Honour recipients by name (A)
 List of foreign recipients of Legion of Honour by name
 List of foreign recipients of the Legion of Honour by country
 List of foreign recipients of the Legion of Honour by decade

External links

 
 

1911 births
2002 deaths
People from Tulkarm
People from Beirut vilayet
Turkish people of Bosniak descent
Turkish scientists
Turkish archaeologists
Istanbul High School alumni
Berlin University of the Arts alumni
Academic staff of Ankara University
Knights Commander of the Order of Merit of the Federal Republic of Germany
Officiers of the Légion d'honneur
Commanders of the Order of Merit of the Italian Republic
Members of the Académie des Inscriptions et Belles-Lettres
Members of the Lincean Academy
METU Mustafa Parlar Foundation Science Award winners
Members of the Austrian Academy of Sciences
20th-century archaeologists
Corresponding Fellows of the British Academy